Dixons Kings Academy is a mixed free school for pupils aged 11 to 16 located in Bradford, West Yorkshire, England. The school opened as the Kings Science Academy in September 2011 and was one of the first free schools to open in England. It cost £10,451,327 to build and, pays an annual rent of £296,000

The school was founded by Sajid Hussain Raza, the school's first principal, who was convicted of fraud in August 2016

The school "comes closest to David Cameron's vision of what a free school should be." The school leases the land from Alan Lewis, vice-chairman of the Conservative Party. It is on a 20 year lease.

History
The school was founded by Sajid Hussain Raza, the school's first principal, who was convicted of fraud in August 2016 after diverting £150,000 of Department of Education grants into his personal bank account, treating the Academy "like a family business employing his relatives there and, for at least the first 12 months, operating with no proper governance."

When it opened, London's The Independent said the school "comes closest to David Cameron's vision of what a free school should be." Kings Science Academy has a longer school day (8.00am–3.30pm) than most other schools, and the library remains open until 9.30pm "for those with no quiet space at home." Raza anticipated that eventually 80% of pupils would progress into the sixth form and higher education, and that "most of them" would go to the top 20 research-led universities known as the Russell Group.

One of the school's key supporters is Alan Lewis, vice-chairman of the Conservative Party and owner of the land on which the school stands. The school leases the land from Lewis at an annual cost of £296,000 for 20 years. The school is operated by trustees Kifsa Ltd. and wholly financed by central government through the Education Funding Agency. The current premises were completed in 2012 at a cost of £10.5 million.

Fraud by senior staff

Kings Science Academy was the subject of an investigation and report by BBC Television's Newsnight current affairs programme on 25 October 2013, following claims by a whistleblower alleging serious financial irregularities, nepotism and fraud. The investigation was launched when journalists obtained a leaked copy of a May 2013 draft report by the Department for Education's (DfE) Internal Audit Investigation Team (IAIT). The DfE subsequently published a "heavily redacted" version of the report.

Ofsted judgments
Following the school's first inspection in February 2013 the Office for Standards in Education, Children's Services and Skills (Ofsted) classified the school as "requires improvement" with regard to achievement of pupils, quality of teaching, behaviour and safety of pupils, and leadership and management. Overall, the school was classified Grade 3 (Requires Improvement). 

The school joined the Dixons Academies Trust and was renamed Dixons Kings Academy in January 2015.

Classroom stabbing of teacher
On 11 June 2015, teacher Vincent Uzomah was stabbed in the stomach by a 14-year-old pupil during a lesson in the school. The attack was premeditated, and racially motivated because the boy, of Pakistani heritage, "hated being disciplined by a black man". In August 2015 he was convicted of the attack and sentenced to 11 years imprisonment for causing grievous bodily harm with intent.

Dixons Academies Trust

The school is now part of the Dixons Academy Trust which includes this school, Dixons Allerton Academy, Dixons City Academy, Dixons McMillan Academy and Dixons Trinity Academy.

In March 2017 Ofsted judged the school outstanding in all areas.

See also

Discovery New School

Footnotes

References

External links
Department for Education statement on Kings Science Academy (25 October 2013)
National Union of Teachers statement on Kings Science Academy (25 October 2013)

Schools in Bradford
Free schools in Yorkshire
Educational institutions established in 2011
Secondary schools in the City of Bradford
2011 establishments in England